Beymelek is a village in the District of Demre, Antalya Province, Turkey.

References

Villages in Demre District